Nasir P. Ramlee (23 November 1953 – 17 December 2008) was a Malaysian actor, composer, musician and singer.

Early life 
Ramlee was born in Singapore, the son of Malaysian actor P. Ramlee and Junaidah Daeng Harris, whom P. Ramlee married in 1951 and divorced in 1954.

Career
Nasir started his career as a musician in a nightclub before he joined EMI as a music composer. After that, he served as coordinator of combo music at the Istana Budaya (IB) from April 2002.

He later teamed  up with the late Datuk Ahmad Daud, Normadiah, Aziz Jaafar and Datuk Aziz Sattar to form the Panca Sitara band.

He had produced songs for Herman Tino, Rosemarie Abdul Hamid and Aman Shah. Among the songs is the popular Rindu Bayangan performed by Carefree.

During his tenure at the IB, Nasir was much involved with shows that were organized by the government as well as those at an international level, such as events like Suzana 60 and Boney M Live In Kuala Lumpur in 2006.

Personal life
Nasir was married three times. His first wife was Mariati Abdul Rahman and his second wife was Rashidah Jaafar. Both marriages ended in divorce. His third marriage was to Surjangsih Abu Bakar until his demise. He had seven children from his three marriages. His first marriage saw three children, Gunina, Gunawan and Gunarisasca. His second marriage had two daughters, Natasya and Najua, and his third two sons, Zaidi and Zakaria.

Death
He died on 17 December 2008 at the age of 55 due to heart complications and diabetes. He was buried at Jalan Ampang Muslim Cemetery, Kuala Lumpur next to the graves of his late father, P. Ramlee and his two step-mothers, Norizan and Saloma.

Filmography

Film

Other roles
 Manis-Manis Sayang (1986) - music
 Bujang Lapok Kembali Daa (1986) - music
 Pagar-Pagar Cinta (1986) - music

Other songs
 "Pi Mai Pi Mai Tang Tu"
 "Melanchong Ke Tanjung"

See also
 P. Ramlee

References

External links
 
 

1953 births
2008 deaths
21st-century Singaporean male actors
20th-century Singaporean male actors
Singaporean male film actors
21st-century Malaysian male actors
20th-century Malaysian male actors
Malaysian people of Acehnese descent
Malaysian people of Malay descent
People from Singapore
Deaths from diabetes